James Herbert Merryweather (2 May 1929 – 19 February 2000) was an English cricketer.  Merryweather was a right-handed batsman who bowled right-arm off break.  He was born at Rowlands Gill, County Durham.

Merryweather made his Minor Counties Championship debut for Wiltshire in 1954 against the Surrey Second XI.  From 1954 to 1979, he represented the county in 119 Minor Counties Championship matches, the last of which came against Berkshire. He took 714 wickets for Wiltshire.

Merryweather also represented Wiltshire in List-A cricket.  His List-A debut for the county came against Hampshire in the 1964 Gillette Cup.  From 1964 to 1973, he represented the county in 5 matches, the last of which came against Hampshire in the 1973 Gillette Cup.  Merryweather also represented Minor Counties South in the 1972 Benson and Hedges Cup, playing 4 List-A matches for the team.  In his combined List-A matches, he took 18 wickets at a bowling average of 16.50, with best figures of 3/22.

Merryweather died at Bath, Somerset on 19 February 2000.

References

External links
James Merryweather at Cricinfo
James Merryweather at CricketArchive

1929 births
2000 deaths
People from Rowlands Gill
Cricketers from Tyne and Wear
People from Wiltshire
English cricketers
Wiltshire cricketers
Minor Counties cricketers